The 2019–20 Armenian Premier League season was the 28th since its establishment.

Season events
On 21 February, the Football Federation of Armenia announced that FC Yerevan had withdrawn from the league due to financial and technical problems.

On 12 March 2020, the Football Federation of Armenia announced that all Armenian Premier League games had been postponed until 23 March due to the COVID-19 pandemic.

On 10 July, Lori announced that 17 of the players and staff had tested positive for COVID-19, and as a result the whole club was now isolating, and as a result their last game of the season, scheduled for 14 July against Ararat Yerevan was cancelled with the points not being awarded to either team.

Teams

 1Gandzasar will play their home games at the Yerevan Football Academy Stadium in Yerevan, due to the rebuilding of their regular venue Gandzasar Stadium, Kapan.
 2Lori will play at the main training pitch of the Vanadzor Football Academy due to the rebuilding of their regular venue Vanadzor City Stadium, Vanadzor.
 3Noah will play at the Alashkert Stadium, Yerevan, instead of their regular venue Mika Stadium, Yerevan.
 4Yerevan will play at the main training pitch of the Vanadzor Football Academy, instead of their original venue Yerevan Football Academy Stadium, Yerevan.
 5Banants renamed Urartu FC on 2 August 2019.

Personnel and sponsorship

Managerial changes

Regular season

League table

Results

Championship round

Championship round league table

Championship round results

Relegation round

Relegation round league table

Relegation round results

Season statistics

Scoring

Top scorers

Hat-tricks

 4 Player scored 4 goals
 5 Player scored 5 goals

Clean sheets

References

External links
 
 UEFA

Armenian Premier League seasons
Arm
1
Armenian Premier League